"Shine over Babylon" is a song recorded by American rock singer Sheryl Crow originally written and recorded by Irish folk singer Luan Parle. It was the first single released from Crow's album Detours. The song gained some radio airplay and was only released as a digital download, becoming a Triple A - top 5 hit in the United States.

In the summer of 2007, well before its release, Crow told Billboard that the song "is very environmentally conscious, in the tradition of Bob Dylan." She said:

In additional comments on her website, Crow describes the single as "in every way a desperate cry for understanding. Perhaps it is even a battle song in the face of fear."

Music video 
The music video was added to the popular video sharing site YouTube on 21 November 2007. The video comprises Crow singing with an acoustic guitar with newspapers scrolling behind her, relating to headlines that have recently been in the press regarding environmental and poverty issues.

Chart performance

References

2007 singles
Sheryl Crow songs
Songs written by Brian MacLeod (U.S. musician)
Songs written by Bill Bottrell
Songs written by Sheryl Crow
Song recordings produced by Bill Bottrell
2007 songs
A&M Records singles